UFC Fight Night: Anderson vs. Błachowicz 2 (also known as UFC Fight Night 167 and UFC on ESPN+ 25) was a mixed martial arts event produced by the Ultimate Fighting Championship that took place on February 15, 2020 at the Santa Ana Star Center in Rio Rancho, New Mexico, United States.

Background
The event was the first that the promotion has hosted in Rio Rancho, after previously contesting UFC Fight Night: Henderson vs. Khabilov in nearby Albuquerque in June 2014. Zuffa previously hosted a World Extreme Cagefighting event, WEC 32, at the venue in 2008. 

A light heavyweight rematch between The Ultimate Fighter: Team Edgar vs. Team Penn light heavyweight winner Corey Anderson and former KSW Light Heavyweight Champion Jan Błachowicz served as the event headliner in a possible title eliminator. The pairing previously met in September 2015 at UFC 191, with Anderson winning the encounter via unanimous decision.

Ramazan Emeev was scheduled to face Tim Means at the event. However, Emeev was removed from the bout in late January for undisclosed reasons and replaced by promotional newcomer Daniel Rodriguez.

A light heavyweight bout between Gadzhimurad Antigulov and Devin Clark was scheduled to take place at the event. However, Antigulov was pulled from the fight due to an undisclosed reason and replaced by Dequan Townsend.

A women's bantamweight bout between former UFC Women's Flyweight Champion Nicco Montaño and Macy Chiasson was scheduled to take place at the event. However, Montaño was forced to pull out on fight week due to injury and was replaced by promotional newcomer Shanna Young.

At the weigh-ins, former UFC Flyweight Championship challenger Ray Borg failed to make weight, coming in at 128 pounds, two pounds over the flyweight non-title fight limit of 126 pounds. He was fined 30% of his fight purse, which went to Rogério Bontorin and their bout proceeded at a catchweight.

Results

Bonus awards
The following fighters received $50,000 bonuses.
Fight of the Night: Scott Holtzman vs. Jim Miller
Performance of the Night: Jan Błachowicz and Daniel Rodriguez

Records set
This marked the first time two disqualifications occurred at a UFC event.

See also 

 List of UFC events
 List of current UFC fighters
 2020 in UFC

References 

UFC Fight Night
2020 in mixed martial arts
2020 in sports in New Mexico
Mixed martial arts in New Mexico
Sports in Rio Rancho, New Mexico
February 2020 sports events in the United States